The USN or United States Navy is the naval warfare service branch of the United States Armed Forces and one of the seven uniformed services of the United States.

USN may also refer to:
University School of Nashville
University of Southeast Norway
IATA Code for Ulsan Airport in Ulsan, South Korea
Ubiquitous Sensor Network
USN (Update Sequence Number) Journal, a part of the NTFS file system
United States dollar (next day), currency code
United States Note, paper money issued by the US Treasury between 1862 and 1971
Universal Space Network, a company providing space communication services
 Usn, the symbol for the chemical element Unseptnilium
Udham Singh Nagar district, a district in the state of Uttarakhand, India
Uttarakhand Solidarity Network, a non profit organisation of Uttarakhandi Indian diaspora based in Boston, Massachusetts